Bruno Brazil is a Franco-Belgian comics series written by Greg, under the pseudonym Louis Albert, and drawn by William Vance. It was initially serialised in the Franco-Belgian comics magazine Tintin, first appearing on January 17, 1967. The first album publication was in 1969, while the latest album was first published in 1995. While Dargaud had initially published the series up to the penultimate volume, the rights were eventually passed on to Le Lombard, which is part of the same holding company, Média-Participations, and the final volume was published under its banner. As of today, the series is yet to be published in English but is available in various other languages, including French and Spanish.

Synopsis
Bruno Brazil is the leader of a small, elite combat unit of the American secret service, the "Cayman Command", of which each member has some special skills. Together they fight crime and exotic threats. The series is notable for not avoiding casualties among the Cayman Command.

Characters
 Bruno Brazil, the main protagonist. An experienced spy-warrior
 Gaucho Morales, a skillful gangster. A member of the team due to his talents and contacts. 
 Whip Rafale, a previous circus artist, and expert with a whip.
 Texas Bronco, a former rodeo cowboy, strong as an ox.
 Billy Brazil, Bruno Brazil's younger brother. Fresh out of military academy.
 Lafayette called "Big Boy", a cunning former jockey.
 Tony Nomade called "Le Nomade", a replacement after the disappearance of Big Boy.
 Le Colonel L, commander of the elite unit.

Albums
 1. Le requin qui mourut deux fois, 1969, Dargaud
 2. Commando Caïman,  1970, Dargaud
 3. Les yeux sans visage, 1971, Dargaud
 4. La cité pétrifiée, 1972, Dargaud
 5. La nuit des chacals, 1973, Dargaud
 6. Sarabande à Sacramento, 1974, Dargaud
 7. Des caïmans dans la rizière, 1975, Dargaud
 8. Orage aux Aléoutiennes, 1976, Dargaud
 9.  Quitte ou double pour Alak 6, 1977, Dargaud 
10. Dossier Bruno Brazil, 1977, Dargaud
11. La fin...!??,  1995, Le Lombard

Sources

 Bruno Brazil publications in Belgian Tintin  and French Tintin BDoubliées 
 Bruno Brazil albums Bedetheque 

Footnotes

Dargaud titles
Lombard Editions titles
Spy comics